The 1955 Italian Athletics Championships was the 45th edition of the Italian Athletics Championships and were held in Milan (main event) from 30 September to 2 October.

Champions

References

External links
 Italian Athletics Federation

Italian Athletics Championships
Athletics
Italian Athletics Outdoor Championships
Athletics competitions in Italy